Roderick Macdonald, MD, FRCS (1840–1894) was a Scottish doctor and a Crofters Party politician. As a coroner he presided over the inquest of one of the victims in the Whitechapel murders.

Macdonald was the son of Angus Macdonald, a house carpenter, of Fairy Bridge, Skye. He was educated at the Free Church Normal School, Glasgow, and at the University of Glasgow. Later he was a teacher at the Free Church School, Lonmore. He then studied medicine and was LRCP and LRCS, Edinburgh in 1867. He was also a member of the Inner Temple.

He practised medicine in the East End of London, and was divisional surgeon for the police in the Isle of Dogs.

In 1885 Macdonald was elected as the Member of Parliament (MP) for Ross and Cromarty in the crofter's interest. He held the seat until he stood down at the 1892 election. Around 1887, he was elected as coroner for the north-east part of East Middlesex. He presided over the inquest into the death of Mary Jane Kelly, one of the victims in the Whitechapel murders, at Shoreditch Town Hall on 12 November 1888.

On 28 January 1890 Macdonald married Frances Emma Maryon Perceval (20 July 1868 – 15 March 1893), a great-granddaughter of Spencer Perceval. He lived at 65 West Ferry Road, Millwall, and later at 252 Camden Road, Middlesex, where he died from cancer, aged 54.

References

External links
The Crofter - Issue 3, page 1

1840 births
1894 deaths
Deaths from cancer in England
19th-century Scottish medical doctors
Scottish Liberal Party MPs
Members of the Parliament of the United Kingdom for Scottish constituencies
UK MPs 1885–1886
UK MPs 1886–1892
People from the Isle of Skye
People from Ross and Cromarty
Jack the Ripper
Alumni of the University of Glasgow
Crofters Party MPs